Habenaria suaveolens is a species of orchid that is native to western India.

References

suaveolens
Plants described in 1850
Flora of India (region)
Taxa named by Nicol Alexander Dalzell